In 2008, Division B of the FIBA Europe Under-18 Championship basketball tournament was played in Hungary. The Slovenian team finished top of the table.

Qualifying teams

Squads

At the start of tournament, all 20 participating countries will have 12 players on their roster.

Venues

Preliminary round

Group A

Group B

Group C

Group D

Qualifying round

Group E

Group F

Group G

Group H

Knockout stage

1st place bracket

5th place bracket

9th place bracket

13th place bracket

Semifinals

Classification round for 5th to 8th place

Classification round for 9th to 12th place

Classification round for 13th to 16th place

Final

Classification Game for 3rd to 4th place

Classification Game for 5th to 6th place

Classification Game for 7th to 8th place

Classification Game for 9th to 10th place

Classification Game for 11th to 12th place

Classification Game for 13th to 14th place

Classification Game for 15th to 16th place

Classification round for 17th to 20th place

Group I

Final standings

FIBA U18 European Championship Division B
2008–09 in European basketball
2008–09 in Hungarian basketball
International youth basketball competitions hosted by Hungary